Cyriaca, also known as Dominica, was a Roman widow, and patroness to St. Lawrence, and eventually suffered martyrdom.

Life
Cyriaca was a wealthy Roman widow who sheltered persecuted Christians. St. Lawrence used her home in Rome to give food to the poor. After his death, she brought his remains to a catacomb that had been dug into a hill on land she owned. This is now the site of San Lorenzo fuori le mura. 

Cyriaca suffered martyrdom, by being scourged to death for her faith.

St. Cyriaca is commemorated on August 21.

References

249 deaths
Saints from Roman Italy
3rd-century Christian martyrs
Year of birth unknown
Executed ancient Roman women
3rd-century Roman women
Ante-Nicene Christian female saints
People executed by scourging
People executed for apostasy